The historic Jewish Cemetery of Tarnobrzeg, Poland, was founded in 1930 in the Serbinów neighbourhood (now housing estate) of Tarnobrzeg, in the Second Polish Republic. The Jewish cemetery is located close to Sienkiewicza and Dąbrowskiej Streets.

The thriving and traditional Jewish community of Tarnobrzeg established in the 17th century was eradicated during the Holocaust in occupied Poland in World War II.

See also
 Extinct Jewish community of Tarnobrzeg
 History of the Jews in Poland

External links

 Video: Jews and the Jewish Cemetery in Tarnobrzeg

Buildings and structures in Tarnobrzeg
Tarnobrzeg
Holocaust locations in Poland